Choi Min-ho (born December 9, 1991), better known by the mononym Minho, is a South Korean singer, actor, and songwriter. In May 2008, he debuted as a member of South Korean boy group Shinee which later became one of the best-selling Korean artists. Aside from group activities, he debuted as an actor in November 2010 in KBS2's drama special Pianist. He has since landed roles in television series such as Salamander Guru and The Shadows (2012), To the Beautiful You (2012), Medical Top Team (2013), My First Time (2015), and Hwarang: The Poet Warrior Youth (2016). He made his feature film debut in 2016 with Canola. As a soloist, he has released the digital singles "I'm Home" (2019) and "Heartbreak" (2021). He released his debut solo EP, Chase, in 2022.

Career

2008–2009: Career beginnings and Shinee

Choi was discovered at the SM Casting System in 2006 and modeled for Ha Sang-beg's Seoul Collection F/W 08–09 in March 2008. One month later, Choi was chosen as a member of the group Shinee. The five-member boy group debuted on May 25, 2008, on SBS' Inkigayo. The group's first EP, Replay, was released on May 22 and debuted on the Korean music charts MIAK at number ten, peaking at number eight. Choi began participating in the rap making of Shinee's songs with their first studio album The Shinee World, under the guidance of rap instructor JQ.  JQ praised Choi's writing ability and pointed out that he has many good ideas and "a few genius moments here and there". He was especially pleased with Choi's rap lyrics for Shinee's 2009 single "Juliette".

In 2009 and 2010, Choi appeared in both the Korean and Japanese versions of Girls' Generation's music video "Gee". He was also featured in the music video of VNT's debut song "Sound" in 2010. In 2009, Choi joined the popular show Let's Go! Dream Team as a regular cast member.

2010–2015: Acting debut
In 2010, Choi joined the variety show Oh! My School as a cast member and began hosting the music program Show! Music Core alongside bandmate Onew, Miss A member Suzy and T-ara member Jiyeon. He made his acting debut in KBS2's drama special, entitled Pianist, with actress Han Ji-hye. In 2011, Choi was cast in SBS' sitcom, Salamander Guru and The Shadows. He played the role of a genius hacker.

In 2012, Choi was confirmed to take on the lead role, alongside f(x)'s Sulli and Lee Hyun-woo, in To the Beautiful You, a Korean adaptation of the manga Hana-Kimi.
The drama started broadcasting on August 15, 2012, on SBS. In preparation for his role as a high jump gold medalist, Choi received personal training from coach Kim Tae-young, former national high jump athlete and a member of the Korea Association of Athletics Federations, for a month and a half. His personal record was 175 cm. In December 2012, Choi joined dance project group SM The Performance alongside labelmates from TVXQ, Super Junior, Shinee, and Exo.

Choi began hosting the variety show Mamma Mia in April 2013, but departed after a month due to Shinee's touring schedule. He resumed his role as an MC on Show! Music Core after a two-year absence, this time hosting alongside Kim So-hyun and Noh Hong-chul. In July 2013, Choi returned to the small screen with MBC's Medical Top Team. The drama received low ratings and was criticized for trying to tell too many stories at once and losing the main focal point of the story. However, Choi's acting performance received a positive response and was praised for his growth as an actor. In August, he participated in the reality series Star Diving Show Splash, but it was cancelled after four episodes after several contestants were injured.

In 2015, Choi was cast as the lead in OnStyle's drama My First Time together with actress Park So-dam, which was broadcast in September. It was the first drama premiered by OnStyle, with a total of eight episodes.

2016–2020: Big screen debut, solo music and military enlistment

In early 2016, Choi extended his popularity as an actor. He was cast in several projects, including a historical Korean drama entitled Hwarang: The Poet Warrior Youth, which began airing on December 19, 2016, on KBS2. His debut movie project titled Canola, alongside Youn Yuh-jung and Kim Go-eun and directed by Yoon Hong-seung (pseudonym Chang), was filmed in 2015 and released on the big screen in May 2016. He was cast in a supporting role in a film entitled The Princess and the Matchmaker, led by Lee Seung-gi and Shim Eun-kyung. The movie is the second installment in a planned trilogy by Jupiter Films after the 2013 box-office hit The Face Reader.
Choi was then cast in the movie Derailed alongside veteran actor Ma Dong-seok, which was directed by Lee Seong-tae and premiered at the 2016 Cannes Film Festival. The movie had its world premiere screening at the 21st Busan International Film Festival in October 2016.

In 2017, Choi took part in the JTBC web drama entitled Somehow 18 alongside Lee Yu-bi. As a result of high online viewer ratings of more than 870,000 views, the web drama was announced to be broadcast on television through JTBC on 8 October.
After receiving a positive response for his acting performance in Derailed, Choi was cast in science fiction action thriller Illang: The Wolf Brigade, the Korean adaptation of the Japanese anime Jin-Roh: The Wolf Brigade. Choi stated that he chose the role because he wanted to work with director Kim Jee-woon. The film released on July 25, 2018.
In September 2017, Choi received the Special Award at the Indonesian Television Awards 2017 due to his widespread popularity in the country as well as for his performances in various dramas. Choi was the first Korean artist to be presented an award at the show.
On November 15, Choi was included in Vogues list of the "Sexiest Men Alive".
Later that year, Choi was cast in a four episode mini drama The Most Beautiful Goodbye, which is a remake of the 1996 drama of the same name.

In 2019, Choi held a fan meeting tour, Best Choi's Minho, covering four cities: Seoul on February 16, Tokyo on February 23–24, Bangkok on March 2 and Taipei on March 3, 2019. He concluded his tour with an additional fan meeting in Seoul on March 30. Choi released his debut solo single, "I'm Home", as part of SM Station on March 28. He joined the Marine Corps on April 15 for his mandatory military enlistment. The Republic of Korea Marine Corps recognized Choi as an "exemplary marine soldier" for forgoing early discharge to participate in defense drills. Choi completed his military service on November 15, 2020.

2021–present: Further acting roles and Chase
In January 2021, Choi resumed activities as part of Shinee. He also ramped up participation in various shows including a special appearance in web series Lovestruck in the City and main role in reality show Law of the Jungle – Pioneers. In September 2021, Choi debuted as a radio host on Naver Now's broadcast of Best Choice, a sports talk-variety where Minho, well known as an "athletic idol," delivers various sports news and talks with fans and various guests about "his favorite things." He made a special appearance in Yumi's Cells as Chae Woo-gi, the titular character's co-worker and crush. On December 21, 2021, Choi held the fan meeting Best Choi's Minho 2021 offline in Seoul and online through Beyond Live. Choi released the digital single "Heartbreak" on the same day.

In May 2022, Choi held a solo fan meeting, Shinee World J Presents "Best Choi's Minho" 2022, in Japan, in addition to performing two new songs.  He appeared in the horror film New Normal, directed by Jeong Beom-sik. It was selected as the closing film of the 26th Bucheon International Fantastic Film Festival. His first Japanese songs, "Romeo and Juliet" and "Falling Free", were digitally released on August 24. He released his debut solo EP, Chase, on December 6, 2022. Choi starred in the Netflix series The Fabulous alongside Chae Soo-bin later that month. He embarked on a fan meeting tour in January 2023, beginning at the SM Mall of Asia Arena in the Philippines and continuing on to Taiwan, Hong Kong and Japan.

Personal life

Choi graduated from Konkuk University's affiliated high school on February 10, 2010.  After taking the college admissions test the previous year, he was admitted in 2010 to Konkuk's part-time admittance for the arts and culture film major and graduated in 2015. His father, Choi Yun-kyum, is a well-known South Korean soccer coach. Choi inherited his father's ability and showed his skills in shows like KBS2's Our Town's Physical Variety and won high praise from Lee Young-pyo, a retired member of the national team. Choi also led his team to victory at the Idol Futsal World Cup Competition. Originally, Choi wanted to become a professional football player like his father but he disapproved of his decision stating: "Frankly, I didn't want him to follow my path, [...] Back when I was playing, it was difficult to make it in that world, very abusive back in those days. I would stay home for a couple of hours and then be off to training camp. It pained me to see my son asking me to stay over for the night." His father also added that from the football manager's point of view, he didn't think his son had it in him to make it in that field, stating Minho is a strong-willed person, but has a small frame.

Other ventures

Endorsements and ambassadorships
In 2011, he was named an Honorary Ambassador for Youth 2011. In 2014, Choi and Yoona were appointed as UNICEF Unihero Campaign Ambassadors "Giving Hope to the Children". In the same year, he was listed among the highest paid advertising models, receiving 300 million won as his annual advertising rate. In 2016, Choi was part of UNICEF's "#Imagine" campaign, which was first introduced in November 2014 to commemorate the 25th anniversary of the United Nation's Convention on the Rights of the Child.

In 2015, Choi was selected as a model for NY luxury fashion brand Coach alongside Choi Soo-young and Victoria Song. He attended the Coach 2016 S/S fashion show in New York. Furthermore, he attended Gucci's 2017 F/W fashion show in Milan and Givenchy's 2018 fashion show in Paris, where he was listed among the best dressed celebrities. In November 2017, Choi together with the First Lady of the United States Melania Trump attended the "Girls Play 2" campaign at the US embassy in Korea, an event organised to promote the 2018 Winter Olympics. In 2018, Choi was chosen as the official face of the Korea Sale Festa, the largest shopping event in Korea, becoming the first-ever Korean idol to promote it. In July 2021, the Korean Professional Football Federation appointed Choi as one of five K-League Ambassadors to help promote the league to the public.

In 2022, the Korea Creative Content Agency together with the Ministry of Culture, Sports and Tourism unveiled the second part of their immersive cultural project "Age of Light" in which Choi is appeared as a virtual figure in the artificial intelligence experience booth, "Gwanghwa In". Pernod Ricard Korea announced in January of the same year that they selected Ju Ji-hoon and Choi as the new brand ambassadors of the modern classic scotch whisky brand Ballantine's and launched the new global campaign "Time Well Spent". In 2023, he was named the new face of Godiva, and participated in campaigns for Valentine's Day and White Day.

Philanthropy 
In March 2023, Choi donated 5 million won to Cheongju North Chungcheong Province for the love hometown project.

Discography

Extended plays

Singles

Music videos

Songwriting credits
All songwriting credits are adapted from the Korea Music Copyright Association's database and liner notes unless otherwise noted.

Filmography

Film

Television

Variety shows

Web shows

Radio

Hosting

Music video appearances

Awards and nominations

See also
Shinee discography
List of awards and nominations received by Shinee

Notes

References

External links

 
 
 Choi Min-ho at SM Town

Shinee members
South Korean male idols
South Korean male pop singers
South Korean male rappers
South Korean television presenters
South Korean male film actors
South Korean male television actors
South Korean male web series actors
21st-century South Korean male singers
21st-century South Korean male actors
Konkuk University alumni
Musicians from Incheon
SM Entertainment artists
1991 births
Living people
Republic of Korea Marine Corps personnel